Burg Stargard (Polabian: Stargart, until 1929: Stargard in Mecklenburg) is a small town in the Mecklenburgische Seenplatte district, in Mecklenburg-Vorpommern, Germany.

The town's sights include: Germany's most northerly hill castle, a local history museum in the castle, a historic town centre and an exhibition by Marie Hager, the well-known German artist.

History 
The castle is first mentioned in 1170, as Stargart — meaning "old castle,"old city/town" in the now-extinct West Slavic language Polabian, Pomeranian and the only surviving cousin of Polabian, Kashubian language. The name is a combination of stari (old) and gard (town/city/castle). Allegedly, the Bishopric of Havelberg presented the castle to Broda Abbey on its foundation, but the relevant document is a forgery; the place is attested as Staregart in a later document, however, probably dating to the year 1244. Supposedly to avoid confusion with other cities named Stargard, the town has been known as Burg Stargard since 1929.

From the early 13th century, merchants and artisans started settling around the base of the castle, betraying the increasing colonization of formerly Slavic areas and being of early importance as a centre of the Lordship of Stargard, named for the castle, with a Bergfried being erected in 1250. No archaeological evidence can be found for earlier Slavic settlements in the location, however. The castle is now the most northerly high castle in Germany and the oldest secular building in Mecklenburg-Vorpommern.

In 1259, Brandenburg awarded Stargard with town privileges. At the 1292 marriage of Henry II, Lord of Mecklenburg, the Lordship was given as dowry by the Ascanians to the princes, who later became dukes of Mecklenburg. Stargard became the residence of the rulers of Mecklenburg-Stargard, an offshoot of the Mecklenburg dynasty, between 1352 and 1471. According to the Sächsischer Lehnsabhängigkeit, Charles IV, Holy Roman Emperor granted Reichsunmittelbarkeit to the territory on 16 October 1347, subsequently granting the territory as a fief of the Mecklenburg princes.

During the Thirty Years' War, the castle served as headquarters for Johann t'Serclaes, Count of Tilly, general of the Imperial forces, later becoming a seat of ducal administration. The town suffered during the general decline of the region in the aftermath of the Thirty Years' War. In 1758 a major fire largely destroyed the town; emblematic of the town's fading fortunes, losing its local importance.

In the wake of the German Revolution, a 1920 Amtsordnung redefined political borders in the area, with an Amt of Stargard based in Neubrandenburg and an Amt of Strelitz, based in Neustrelitz.

In 1929, the town of Stargard was renamed Burg Stargard, to differentiate it from other namesakes, particularly the nearby Stargard in Pommern, now Stargard in the West Pomeranian Voivodeship of Poland but then in the Prussian Province of Pomerania. On 10 January 1934, the two Ämter were merged into Kreis Strelitz district based in Neustrelitz, later to be known as Kreis Stargard. These local government arrangements survived until the 1952 reorganization of local government within the German Democratic Republic (East Germany).

During World War II, Jewish women from Poland, the Soviet Union and France were held in the "Nemerower Holz", an outpost of the Ravensbrück concentration camp, where parts were manufactured for the V-1 flying bomb, with between 1200 and 2000 women enduring forced labour here. In April 1945, camp Waldbau was emptied and the prisoners were forced on a death march to Malchow, where survivors were liberated by the Red Army.

After the reunification of Germany, urban regeneration of the town included renovation of the castle and the historic town centre, though this latter is now falling into decay.

The castle is now a tourist attraction in the area, with views from the tower and special events such as an annual knights' tournament. In July 2009, there was a three-day festival celebrating the 750th anniversary of the town's charter, with a parade showing scenes from the town's history, a rock concert and a fireworks display.

Notable people from Burg Stargard 
 Marie Hager 
 Marie Hager (20 March 1872 – 1947) was a painter from Stargard, who had exhibitions in Munich, Hamburg and Paris. She died in Burg Stargard in 1947 and was buried in the local cemetery.
 Carl Friedrich Stolte
 Carl Friedrich Stolte (27 December 1824 – 19 April 1897) was born in Neustrelitz and became a teacher in Stargard in 1844. He studied in Mirow and worked after the ideas of Pestalozzi. He initiated a sports arena for physical education at Burg Stargard school and wrote textbooks for German and Geography lessons.
 Johanna Beckmann
 Johanna Beckmann (3 May 1868 – 8 February 1941) was born in Brüssow and spent her childhood in Stargard. She was a china painter and silhouette artist. In April 1886 she began to work in Berlin at the royal arts and crafts museum and the royal art school, later working as a designer at the Royal China Manufacture.  She subsequently concentrated on developing her silhouette art, illustrating magazines and books. In 1913 she won a scholarship to Rome. In 1941, she died in Berlin; her grave in Burg Stargard is still a memorial today.
 Carl Ludwig Christian Rümker 
 Carl Rümker (28 May 1788 – 21 December 1862) was born in Stargard and studied at the Builders' Academy in Berlin, graduating in 1807 as a master builder. Rather than building, he taught mathematics in Hamburg until 1809 when he went to England to work for the East India Company as midshipman. In 1821 he went to New South Wales as astronomer at Sir Thomas Brisbane's observatory. Rümker was awarded the silver medal of the Royal Astronomical Society together with £100, for his re-discovery of Encke's Comet in 1822 and also received the gold medal of the Institute of France. Rümker returned to Europe in 1830 and took charge of the new Hamburg Observatory, publishing a preliminary catalogue of the stars of the Southern Hemisphere in 1832; from 1846–52 he published his great catalogue of 12,000 stars. He died in Lisbon in 1862. His son George took over as director of the Hamburg Observatory in 1857, where he served until his death in 1900.
 Karl Friedrich Vollrath Hoffmann (1796-1842), geographer, publicist
 Volker Schmidt (1942-2002), archaeologist, Rethra researcher

Sport 
Burg Stargard has a multisport club, SV Burg Stargard 09, with around 400 sportsmen playing football, handball, volleyball and athletics.

International relations

Burg Stargard is twinned with:
  Marne in Dithmarschen, Schleswig-Holstein, Germany, since 1990
  Tychowo, Białogard County in West Pomerania, Poland, since 2006

References

External links 

 

Cities and towns in Mecklenburg
Towns in Mecklenburg-Western Pomerania
States and territories established in the 12th century
1920 disestablishments in Germany
Populated places established in the 13th century
1250s establishments in the Holy Roman Empire
1259 establishments in Europe
Grand Duchy of Mecklenburg-Strelitz
Holocaust locations in Germany